The 1983 Queensland rugby league tour of Papua New Guinea and England was a tour that took place in two parts. In June 1983 the Queensland team took in a one-week tour of Papua New Guinea, then following the end of the 1983 Brisbane Rugby League season, the team embarked on a 3-game, 2 week tour of England in October.

Leadership
The team was coached by Arthur Beetson and was captained by Wally Lewis.

Touring squad
Chris Phelan who played for the 1983 Sydney premiers Parramatta was the only non-Queensland based player in the 21 man touring squad.

Note: Table only includes statistics from the English leg of the tour.

|- bgcolor="#CCCCFF"
| Player
| Club
| Position(s)
| Games
| Tries
| Goals
| F/Goals
| Points
|-
|- bgcolor="#FFFFFF"
| Shane Bernardin
|  Norths Devils
| 
| 2
| –
| –
| –
| –
|-
|- bgcolor="#FFFFFF"
| Mitch Brennan
|  Redcliffe Dolphins
| 
| 3
| 2
| –
| –
| 8
|-
|- bgcolor="#FFFFFF"
| Larry Briggenshaw
|  Easts Tigers
| 
| 2
| –
| –
| –
| –
|-
|- bgcolor="#FFFFFF"
| Greg Dowling
|  Wynnum Manly Seagulls
| 
| 2
| 1
| –
| –
| 4
|-
|- bgcolor="#FFFFFF"
| Brett French
|  Wynnum Manly Seagulls
| 
| 3
| 2
| –
| –
| 8
|-
|- bgcolor="#FFFFFF"
| Wally Fullerton Smith
|  Redcliffe Dolphins
| 
| 2
| 1
| –
| –
| 4
|-
|- bgcolor="#FFFFFF"
| Cavill Heugh
|  Easts Tigers
| 
| 2
| 1
| –
| –
| 4
|-
|- bgcolor="#FFFFFF"
| Gavin Jones
|  Easts Tigers
| 
| 3
| –
| –
| –
| –
|-
|- bgcolor="#FFFFFF"
| Paul Khan
|  Easts Tigers
| 
| 1
| –
| –
| –
| –
|-
|- bgcolor="#FFFFFF"
| Joe Kilroy
|  Norths Devils
| 
| 3
| 2
| –
| –
| 8
|-
|- bgcolor="#FFFFFF"
| Wally Lewis (c)
|  Fortitude Valley Diehards
| 
| 3
| 3
| 1
| –
| 14
|-
|- bgcolor="#FFFFFF"
| Wayne Lindenberg
|  Easts Tigers
| 
| 2
| 2
| –
| –
| 8
|-
|- bgcolor="#FFFFFF"
| Shane McNally
|  Easts Tigers
| 
| 2
| –
| 11
| –
| 22
|-
|- bgcolor="#FFFFFF"
| Gene Miles
|  Wynnum Manly Seagulls
| 
| 3
| 3
| –
| –
| 12
|-
|- bgcolor="#FFFFFF"
| Mark Murray
|  Redcliffe Dolphins
| 
| 2
| –
| –
| –
| –
|-
|- bgcolor="#FFFFFF"
| Bryan Niebling
|  Redcliffe Dolphins
| 
| 2
| –
| –
| –
| –
|-
|- bgcolor="#FFFFFF"
| Trevor Paterson
|  Easts Tigers
| 
| 2
| –
| –
| –
| –
|-
|- bgcolor="#FFFFFF"
| Chris Phelan
|  Parramatta Eels (NSWRFL)
| 
| 3
| 1
| –
| –
| 4
|-
|- bgcolor="#FFFFFF"
| Colin Scott
|  Wynnum Manly Seagulls
| 
| 2
| 2
| –
| –
| 8
|-
|- bgcolor="#FFFFFF"
| Steve Stacey
|  Easts Tigers
| 
| 1
| –
| –
| –
| –
|-
|- bgcolor="#FFFFFF"
| Brad Tessmann
|  Souths Magpies
| 
| 1
| –
| –
| –
| –
|-

Papua New Guinea

England

Hull KR: George Fairbairn (c), Garry Clark, Mike Smith, John Dorahy, Gary Prohm, Steve Hartley, Gordon Smith, Roy Holdstock, David Watkinson, Mark Broadhurst, Phil Hogan, Chris Burton, David Hall. Res – David Laws, Andy Kelly, Tracy Lazenby. Coach – Roger Millward

Queensland: Colin Scott, Steve Stacey, Gene Miles, Brett French, Mitch Brennan, Wally Lewis (c), Mark Murray, Paul Khan, Shane Bernardin, Brad Tessmann, Bryan Neibling, Chris Phelan, Wally Fullerton-Smith. Res – Joe Kilroy, Wayne Lindenberg, Trevor Paterson, Gavin Jones

Wigan: Colin Whitfield, Ronnie Braithwaite, David Stephenson, Tim Wilby, Henderson Gill, David Wood, Jimmy Fairhurst, Kerry Hemsley, Howie Tamati, Brian Case, Danny Campbell, Graeme West (c), John Pendlebury. Res – Shaun Wane, Mick Scott, Brian Dunn. Coach – Alex Murphy

Queensland: Joe Kilroy, Brett French, Gene Miles, Wally Lewis (c), Mitch Brennan, Wayne Lindenberg, Larry Briggenshaw, Greg Dowling, Shane McNally, Chris Phelan, Gavin Jones, Cavill Heugh, Trevor Paterson

Leeds: Ian Wilkinson, Paul Prendiville, David Creasser, Steve Martin, Andrew Smith, John Holmes, Kevin Dick, Ron Dickinson, Russ Sowden, Keith Rayne, Kevin Rayne, Kevin Squire, David Herron. Res – David Heselwood, Colin Cooper, Garry Clark Kevin James. Coach – Robin Dewhurst

Queensland: Joe Kilroy, Brett French, Gene Miles, Mitch Brennan, Colin Scott, Wally Lewis (c), Mark Murray, Greg Dowling, Shane McNally, Shane Bernardin, Chris Phelan, Bryan Neibling, Wally Fullerton-Smith. Res – Gavin Jones, Cavill Heugh, Larry Briggenshaw

Aftermath
As had happened at the end of the unbeaten 1982 Kangaroo tour (which Wally Lewis, Gene Miles and Mark Murray had all been a part of with Lewis the Kangaroos vice-captain), a number of the Queensland players were targeted by cashed-up English clubs. Wally Lewis, despite feeling jaded due to not having a break from the game since the end of the 1981 BRL season, accepted a £30,000 offer to join Wakefield Trinity for 10 games before returning to Australia for the start of the 1984 BRL season where he would move from his junior club Fortitude Valley Diehards to join the Wynnum Manly Seagulls.

Greg Dowling would join Wigan for a season in 1985–86 season. Wally Fullerton Smith joined Leeds for the 1984–85 season. Joe Kilroy joined Halifax and Chris Phelan joined Oldham.

References

Rugby league tours of Great Britain
Queensland rugby league team
Queensland rugby league tour of Papua New Guinea and England
Queensland rugby league tour of Papua New Guinea and England